Altschwendt is a municipality in the district of Schärding in the Austrian state of Upper Austria.

Geography
Altschwendt lies in the Innviertel. About 13 percent of the municipality is forest, and 80 percent is farmland.

References

Cities and towns in Schärding District